Helena Francisca Hamerow, FSA (born 18 September 1961) is an American-born archaeologist, best known for her work on the archeology of early medieval communities in Northwestern Europe. She is Professor of Early Medieval archaeology and former Head of the School of Archaeology, University of Oxford.

Early life and education
The daughter of Theodore S. Hamerow, Hamerow attended the University of Wisconsin-Madison from 1979 to 1983, where she earned a BA in Anthropology. She continued her education at the University of Oxford, where she completed her PhD in 1988.

Academic career
She was a Mary Somerville research fellow at Somerville College until 1990. In 1991, she was appointed as a lecturer in Early medieval archaeology at Durham University. In 1996, Hamerow returned to Oxford as Professor of Early Medieval Archaeology, where she continues today.  She is also a Fellow of St Cross College, where she was Vice-Master from 2005 to 2008. She was Head of the School of Archaeology from 2010 to 2013.

Hamerow an elected member of the Council of the University of Oxford.

Research
Hamerow's research centres on the archaeology of rural communities during the Anglo-Saxon era, specifically the impact on farmers and the early medieval settlements by the founding of monasteries, kingdoms and towns. She has researched and written on the settlement archaeology of the North Sea regions from the period 400—900 AD. She has participated in several projects on the Upper Thames Valley during the Anglo-Saxon period, notably at Sutton Courtenay and Dorchester-on-Thames. Hamerow is currently leading a four year project funded by the European Research Council (ERC):  Feeding Anglo-Saxon England: The Bioarchaeology of an Agricultural Revolution. The project's aim is to investigate the "agricultural revolution" that occurred in Europe between 800 and 1200 AD, as a result of the expansion of cereal farming.

The University of Oxford holds an archive of unpublished material from excavations by Sonia Chadwick Hawkes. Hamerow, who was a student of Hawkes, led a project to digitise the archive. It concluded in 2007 and was funded by the Arts and Humanities Research Council and the Römisch-Germanische Kommission.

Hamerow is co-Director of the ongoing excavation at Dorchester-on-Thames, the Discovering Dorchester research project. She was instrumental in the project's design in 2007 and has continued to co-lead the project since the beginning. The project is sponsored by three co-partners: Oxford's School of Archeology, Oxford Archaeology, and the Dorchester Museum. The site is notable for the large quantity of important archeological remains dating from the prehistoric period to the medieval era.

Hamerow is Principal Investigator (PI) of the multi-disciplinary project, Origins of Wessex, which has been investigating the development of the kingdom of Wessex in the Upper Thames Valley. The area is renowned for its heavy concentrations of Anglo-Saxon archaeology. The project team is currently excavating a large Anglo-Saxon settlement at Long Wittenham in Oxfordshire. The site is well known for having an exceptionally furnished Anglo-Saxon cemetery and many large Anglo-Saxon buildings.

Media

British television
Hamerow has appeared on BBC Four's Digging for Britain in 2010 and King Alfred and the Anglo Saxons in 2013. From 2008 to 2010, she appeared on two episodes of the long-running archaeology TV series, Time Team.

Open letter to the Guardian
In 2008, the British government announced that all human remains uncovered during archaeological excavations in England and Wales were to be reburied within two years.
In 2011, Hamerow was one of forty leading archaeologists who published an open letter to the Justice Secretary, Kenneth Clarke in the Guardian, asking for more time to study ancient human remains found in archaeological excavations. 
Later that year, in response to the letter, the Ministry of Justice (MoJ)  began issuing licences to museums, allowing them to keep human remains for analysis. They also renewed negotiations with representatives of English Heritage and the Institute for Archaeologists to develop a new policy for the retention and burial of human remains.

Awards and honours
Hamerow was elected as a Fellow to the Society of Antiquaries of London in May, 1996. She is a Commissioner of Historic England, a former President of the Society for Medieval Archaeology and Vice-President of the Royal Archaeological Institute.

Selected publications

Books

Journals

References

Alumni of the University of Oxford
American women archaeologists
Fellows of the Society of Antiquaries of London
University of Wisconsin–Madison College of Letters and Science alumni
Living people
1961 births
Fellows of Somerville College, Oxford
British women historians
Academics of Durham University
American women academics
21st-century American women